"She's Out of My Life" is a song written by American songwriter Tom Bahler and performed by American singer Michael Jackson. The song was released as the fourth single from Jackson's 1979 album Off the Wall released on April 19, 1980. In 2004, the song appeared in The Ultimate Collection. It peaked at No. 10 on the Billboard Hot 100, marking the first time any solo artist had ever achieved four Top 10 hits from one album.  In America, it earned a million-selling Platinum certification. 

The demo version of the song, which features Jackson singing with a guitar, was released on the second disc of the 2009 album Michael Jackson's This Is It. The song has also been covered by a variety of artists, including Patti LaBelle, Shirley Bassey, Ginuwine, 98°, S Club 7, Barbara Mandrell, Daniel Evans, Nina, Willie Nelson, Josh Groban, Gloria Lynne, and Karel Gott.

Background
Unlike the album's previous singles, which are all uptempo dance-oriented funk and disco songs, "She's Out of My Life"  is an emotional ballad. The song has a tempo of 66 beats per minute, making it one of Jackson's slowest songs.

The song is about a painful breakup. It has been claimed that Bahler wrote the song about Karen Carpenter, whom Bahler had briefly dated. However, he has stated, "The fact is, I had already written that song by the time Karen and I became romantic. That song was written more about Rhonda Rivera... Rhonda and I had been together for two years, and it was after we broke up that I started dating Karen."

Production
Jones had originally intended to save the song for Frank Sinatra. However, he wanted Jackson to record material with more mature themes and "feel the full range of his voice," so he decided to bring the song to Jackson's attention.

A poignant moment in the song occurs near the end when Jackson begins to break down in tears as he sings the word "life". Although he had attempted to record the song's last few moments with emotional restraint, after numerous tries he continued to end the rendition the same - by breaking down in tears. Producer Quincy Jones subsequently let Jackson's tearful recording stand:

She's Out of My Life, I'd been carrying around for about three years—you can feel the pain in it, you know. And I held on to it and finally something said 'this is the right moment to give it to Michael'.

And when we recorded it with Michael, I know it was an experience he'd never even thought about to sing in a song, 'cause it's a very mature emotion. And he cried at the end of every take, you know. We recorded about—I don't know—8-11 takes, and every one at the end, he just cried, and I said 'hey - that's supposed to be, leave it on there.'

—Quincy Jones,  Off the Wall 2001 Special Edition, Quincy Jones Interview 3

In Jackson's autobiography, Moonwalk, he wrote that the song is about knowing that barriers separating him from others are seemingly easy to overcome, yet they cause him to miss out on what he really desires. He said that he cried from the sudden effect of the words because "I had been letting so much build up inside me." Particularly it reminded him of his feeling of being "so rich in some experiences while being poor in moments of true joy." He worried about this feeling showing up on the song, but also felt "if it touched people's heartstrings, knowing that would make me feel less lonely." He described making Off the Wall as "one of the most difficult periods of my life...I had very few close friends at the time and felt very isolated." He would walk through his neighborhood, hoping to meet people who didn't know who he was, so he could meet "somebody who would be my friend because they liked me and needed a friend too, not because I was who I am."

Release and reception
The song peaked at #10 in the United States on the Billboard Hot 100. The single was even more successful in the UK and peaked at number 3 on the charts (the equivalent position reached by Off the Wall's debut single "Don't Stop 'til You Get Enough").

Given the popular response to his emotional rendition, the song remained in Jackson's live set for many years.

Critical reception
AllMusic editor Stephen Thomas Erlewine called the song an "overwrought ballad" but praised Jackson's "blindingly gifted" singing on the track. Rolling Stone editor Stephen Holden praised: "The singer's ultradramatic phrasing, which takes huge emotional risks and wins every time, wrings the last drop of pathos from Tom Bahler's tear-jerker, "She's Out of My Life."  Cash Box said it has a "feathery, symphonic opening, muted keyboard work and tearful vocal reading."

Music video
A music video was produced to promote the song, which showed Michael in a blue-green shirt, dark pants, and sitting on a barstool with a spotlight shining behind him. The video uses a split screen technique to simultaneously show Jackson from two different angles during the second and third verses. It was directed by Bruce Gowers, who also directed a similar video for Jackson's previous single "Rock with You." The video is shown far less frequently than Jackson's later videos, but it is included on the DVD box set Michael Jackson's Vision, marking its first DVD release.

Live performances
The song was performed during The Jacksons' Triumph Tour and Victory Tour. It was also performed on Jackson's Bad World Tour, the Dangerous World Tour, and the Royal Brunei concert, which also turned out to be the final live performance of the song, as whilst it was rehearsed for the History World Tour, it was removed from the setlist just before the tour began. The song was also rehearsed as a duet with a female backup vocalist for the first "Michael Jackson & Friends" charity concert in Seoul, South Korea, but cancelled for the final performance, which took place ten years to the day before Jackson's death.

Usually during these performances, Jackson would bring a female audience member up on stage with him while performing the song. Before concluding the song, he would often pause briefly to physically display distress, which he amplified by shielding his face and acting as if he were crying.

The live performances of the song were featured on the Live at Wembley July 16, 1988, Live in Bucharest: The Dangerous Tour, and Michael Jackson: Live at Wembley July 16, 1988 DVDs.  Live audio is available in the Live at Wembley July 16, 1988 CD, included as a bonus on Bad 25, and the 1981 live album, The Jacksons Live!

Track listing
 "She's Out of My Life Official Video

U.S. single
 "She's Out of My Life" – 3:38
 "Get on the Floor" – 4:40

Personnel
Written and composed by Tom Bahler
Produced by Quincy Jones
Recorded and Mixed by Bruce Swedien
Lead vocal by Michael Jackson
Bass: Louis Johnson
Guitar: Larry Carlton
Electric piano: Greg Phillinganes
String arrangement by Johnny Mandel
Concert master: Gerald Vinci

Charts

Weekly charts

Year-end charts

Certifications

Johnny Duncan and Janie Fricke version

Background and recording
"She's Out of My Life" was notably covered as a duet by American country music artists Johnny Duncan and Janie Fricke. For the duet, the song was re-titled to "He's Out of My Life". The pair began recording together when Fricke appeared as a background vocalist on several of Duncan's late 1970s country hits. Her uncredited background vocals led to her own contract with Duncan's label (Columbia Records). In 1980, Duncan and Fricke went into the studio to record their first studio album as a duet pair. Their sessions that year also included "He's Out of My Life". It was recorded at the Columbia Studio, located in Nashville, Tennessee. The session took place in May 1980 and was produced by Billy Sherrill.<ref name="Liner Notes 2">{{cite journal |last1=Duncan |first1=Johnny |last2=Fricke |first2=Janie |title=Nice 'n' Easy (LP Liner Notes and Album Information) |journal=Columbia Records |date=October 1980 |id=JC-36780/PCT-36780}}</ref>

Release and chart performance
In August 1980, "She's My Out of My Life" was released as a single on Columbia Records, crediting both Duncan and Fricke. The single spent 14 weeks on the American Billboard Hot Country Songs chart, peaking at number 17 in September 1980. The track also reached Canada's RPM Country Songs chart where it also reached the top 20, peaking at number 20 in 1980. "He's Out of My Life" was later released on Duncan and Fricke's album Nice 'n' Easy. The album was released in October 1980.

Track listing
7" vinyl single
 "He's Out of My Life" – 3:14
 "Loving Arms" – 3:03

Charts

Other recorded covers
Barbara Mandrell covered the song, retitled "He's Out of My Life", on her 1980 album, Love Is Fair.
Shirley Bassey covered the song, retitled "He's Out of My Life", on her 1982 album All by Myself.
Gloria Lynne covered the song, retitled "He's Out of My Life", on her 1989 album, A Time for Love.
Willie Nelson covered the song on his 1984 album City of New Orleans.
Elaine Paige recorded the song (as "He's Out of My Life") for her 1991 album, Love Can Do That.
 98 Degrees included an a cappella cover on their 1998 album 98 Degrees and Rising.
 Ginuwine included a cover as the final track on his 1999 album 100% Ginuwine.
Josh Groban covered this song as a bonus track on his album Closer in 2003.
Patti LaBelle recorded the song (as "He's Out of My Life") for her 2005 album, Classic Moments.
Nina Girado recorded the song on her 2009 album, Renditions of the Soul. Although the title was unchanged, Girado sang the title line as "He's out of my life."
Daniel Evans released a version on his debut album, No Easy Way, in 2010.

Live covers
Jon Lee from S Club 7 performed the song on their S Club Party Live Tour in 2001.
Scott Bruton performed the song on The X Factor during the Michael Jackson theme week in 2008, as well as Joe McElderry who performed it in 2009.
Ringmasters, a Nordic Barbershop Quartet, performed a David Harrington arrangement as part of their 2010 BHS International competition show.
Miguel performed a tribute at the 58th Annual Grammy Awards

Parodies and references
 Comedian Eddie Murphy sang a few bars from "She's Out of My Life" while imitating Jackson during his 1983 stand-up comedy special Delirious. After the mock tears, he closed it by saying "Tito, get me some tissue..."
 Comedian Richard Jeni sang part of the song when imitating an all love song radio station during his stand-up show, "Platypus Man".
Dave Lister (Craig Charles) sang the first few bars as a lament to Kristine Kochanski during the Red Dwarf episode "Marooned". He claims it to be the first song he learned how to play on the guitar.
 In the end credits of the 2001 film Monsters, Inc.'', Mike Wazowski parodies the song as "She's Out Of Your Hair", sitting atop a stool during a play about the events of the film.

See also
 1979 in music

References

1979 songs
1980 singles
Michael Jackson songs
Johnny Duncan (country singer) songs
Janie Fricke songs
Music videos directed by Bruce Gowers
Songs about loneliness
Songs based on actual events
Song recordings produced by Quincy Jones
Song recordings produced by Billy Sherrill
Epic Records singles
Columbia Records singles
1970s ballads
Pop ballads